The Department of Transport is a department of the Government of Western Australia that is responsible for implementing the state's vehicle licensing, maritime safety, taxi, ports, transport policies. It was formed on 1 July 2009.

It is one of three agencies reporting to the same Director General. The two other transport agencies are:

Public Transport Authority
 Main Roads Western Australia

On 1 July 2009, the State Land Services and Pastoral Leases being transferred to the newly formed Department of Regional Development and Lands.

Directors General
The head of the Department of Transport is the Director General, who is responsible to the Public Sector Commissioner and the Director General of the Department of the Premier and Cabinet.

Menno Henneveld (Acting) (1 July 2009–3 May 2010)
Reece Waldock (3 May 2010–29 July 2016)
Richard Sellers (29 July 2016–)

See also
 Planning and Development Act 2005
 Urban planning in Australia

Notes

External links
 Department of Transport official website

Transport
Transport in Western Australia
State departments of transport of Australia
2009 establishments in Australia
Government agencies established in 2009